Cities with large Cambodian American populations, with a critical mass of at least 1% of the total urban population. Information is based on the 2010 U.S. Census.

The list includes those who immigrated from Cambodia and those who are multi-generational Cambodian Americans. As of 2010, Americans of Cambodian or Khmer descent make up about 0.1% of the United States population, or 300,000 people.

Large cities
The list of large cities (population greater than 250,000) with a Cambodian-American population in excess of one percent of the total population.

Medium-sized cities
List of medium-sized cities (population between 100,000 and 250,000) with a Cambodian-American population in excess of one percent of the total population.

References

Cambodian American
Asian-American history
Cambodian American
Cambodian